Gustave Roussy is the first leader cancer-research hospital in Europe and ranked among the top 3 best specialized hospitals in the world . It is a centre for high quality patient care, research and teaching. It is highly-known for the treatment of (among others):  skin cancers like melanoma, breast cancer, and lung cancer. It provides access to care with many expert doctors who have historically revolutionized the treatment of cancer and contributed to the surge of new molecules in the treatment of cancers and tumors. It is located in the Parisian area. It is named after Gustave Roussy, a Swiss-French neuropathologist.

In April 2019, three new interventional radiology rooms were inaugurated, making it the largest platform of this type in Europe, entirely dedicated to oncology.  Interventional radiology is a so-called "minimally invasive" diagnostic and treatment technique, which uses images to guide access to deep-lying organs, without having to "open up" patients. Gustave Roussy carries out more than 4,000 operations of this type each year.

Notable people 
 Gustave Roussy, first director (1921–1947)
 Tabaré Vázquez
 Maurice Tubiana, fifth director (1982–1988) and member of the French Academy of Sciences
 Georges Mathé, oncologist and immunologist who performed in 1959 the first successful bone marrow transplant not performed on identical twins.
 Frédéric Triebel, discoverer of the immune checkpoint molecule LAG3, worked at the institute from 1986 until around 2001
 Barbara Tudek (1952-2019), biologist and professor who served as president of the Polish section of the European Environmental Mutagenesis and Genomics Society

Gustave-Roussy School of Cancer Sciences 
Together with the Faculty of Medicine of the University of Paris-Saclay, the Gustave-Roussy Institute runs the School of Cancer Sciences, a university establishment specializing in oncology. The lessons take place at the Cancer Campus in Villejuif in the Val-de-Marne.

In the various courses offered by the faculty of medicine (adult, adolescent and child oncology; surgery; best practices; medical imaging; radiotherapy; other courses), the establishment integrates the Doctoral School of Oncology, Biology, Medicine, Health (and its Master 2 in Biology and Health, Cancerology specialty) created with the École Normale Supérieure Paris-Saclay.

Directed in 2015 by Pierre Blanchard, the school had trained nearly 2,800 students and awarded twenty-six university degrees.

Awards and Rankings
In 2020, the Institut Gustave Roussy was ranked as the first leading cancer hospital in Europe and in the top 5  best specialized hospitals in the world.

Incidents 
In 2017, a virologist from the Institut Gustave Roussy was sentenced to 5 years in prison for poisoning colleagues with sodium azide in 2014.

Notes

Hospital buildings completed in 1926
Hospitals in Val-de-Marne
Medical research institutes in France
Villejuif